When Somebody Loves You may refer to:
When Somebody Loves You (album), by Alan Jackson
 "When Somebody Loves You" (Alan Jackson song), its title track
"When Somebody Loves You" (Restless Heart song)